Claudio Mauricio Lizama Villegas (born 21 March 1973) is a Chilean former professional footballer who played as a defender for clubs in Chile and Indonesia.

Club career
A product of Universidad Católica youth system, as a member of the team he won the 1993 Copa Interamericana, 1995 Copa Chile and the 1997 Apertura of the Primera División, in addition to be the runner-up in the 1993 Copa Libertadores.

In Chilean Primera División, he also played for Deportes Concepción (loan on 1993), Santiago Wanderers (1998), Coquimbo Unido (1999–2000) and Deportes Puerto Montt (2001). In Chilean Primera B, he played for Fernández Vial (2002).

Abroad, he played in Indonesia for Persib Bandung in 2003–04, where he coincided with compatriots such as Rodrigo Lemunao, Alejandro Tobar and the coach Juan Páez, and for PSPS Pekanbaru in 2005, where he scored a goal.

International career
Lizama represented Chile at under-20 level in 1993 alongside players such as Francisco Rojas, Claudio Villan and Marcelo Salas. At under 23-level, he represented Chile in the 1996 Pre-Olympic Tournament. Previously, he had represented the Chile senior team in a 2–0 win versus Canada in 11 October 1995.

Honours
Universidad Católica
 Chilean Primera División: 1997 Apertura
 Copa Chile: 1995 Copa Chile
 Copa Interamericana: 1993

References

External links
 
 
 Claudio Lizama at PartidosdeLaRoja.com 

1973 births
Living people
Footballers from Santiago
Chilean footballers
Chile international footballers
Chile under-20 international footballers
Chile youth international footballers
Chilean expatriate footballers
Club Deportivo Universidad Católica footballers
Deportes Concepción (Chile) footballers
Santiago Wanderers footballers
Coquimbo Unido footballers
Puerto Montt footballers
C.D. Arturo Fernández Vial footballers
Persib Bandung players
PSPS Riau players
Chilean Primera División players
Primera B de Chile players
Indonesian Premier Division players
Chilean expatriate sportspeople in Indonesia
Expatriate footballers in Indonesia
Association football defenders